Mattia Pagliuca (born 25 April 2002) is an Italian footballer who plays for  club Bologna as a winger.

Club career
Mattia Pagliuca made his Serie A debut for Bologna on 13 December 2020 against Roma appearing as a substitute for Emanuel Vignato at the Stadio Renato Dall'Ara in a 5–1 defeat.

Personal life
Mattia is the son of former Italian international goalkeeper Gianluca Pagliuca who also previously played for Bologna.

References

2002 births
Footballers from Bologna
Living people
Italian footballers
Association football wingers
Bologna F.C. 1909 players
Imolese Calcio 1919 players
Serie A players
Serie C players